Yosef Yechiel Mechel Lebovits (Yiddish: יוסף יחיאל מיכל לעבאוויטש) is a Hasidic rebbe and the founder of the Nikolsburg-Monsey Hasidic community.

Family  

Yechiel Mechel Lebovits was born in New York to Rabbi Baruch Yehuda Lebovitz (1908 - 1951) and Yentel Schnitzler (1910 - 1976). His father Baruch was from Hajós, Hungary and helped revive Jewish life in the D.P. camps. His father's family claimed direct paternal descent from Yechiel Michel of Zlotshov (d. 1786), founder of the Zlotshov Hasidic dynasty. His mother Yentel Schnitzler (1910 - 1976) was the daughter of Shraga Shmuel Schnitzler (1889 - 1979) the Tchabe Rav of Jerusalem who was the great-grandson of Rabbi Baruch Schnitzler of Kaliv (1765 - 1820) who the Schnitzler family claim to have been the son-in-law of Shmelke of Nikolsburg (1726 - 1778) from where the Nikolsburg-Monsey community is named. However several genealogists and historians have questioned the Schnitzler connection to Horowitz. Through his mother, Lebovitz is the third-great-grandson of Yechiel Michel Auerbach (1785 - 1856) who was the grandson of Zusha of Hanipol (1718 - 1800) and the great-great-grandson of the Baal Shem Tov (1698 - 1760) who founded Hasidic Judaism. Lebovits married the daughter of Eleazar Meisels, the Av Beit Din of Ihel-Chicago and a descendant of the Meisel family. His brother Baruch Lebovits passed away in 2022.

Biography 
After his father's death, Lebovits' mother Yentel married Eliezer Zusia Portugal (1898 - 1982), the first Skulener Rebbe. In his early years, Lebovits studied in the Satmar Yeshiva, under the tutelage of Joel Teitelbaum (1887 - 1979) who he had private sessions with every Wednesday. Lebovits also had a close connection to the Vizhnitz Rebbe, Mordechai Hager (1922 - 2018) who named Lebovits the Nikolsburger Rebbe. At first Lebovits held court in Williamsburg, Brooklyn, later relocating to Spring Valley in Monsey, New York. The community of Nikolsburg in Monsey has a yeshiva for young adults and boys, a kollel and a beis midrash. He has also authored several works, the most notable of which is "Igeros Yechiel" which is chiddushim on all Torah subjects, including the Talmud, Shulchan Aruch, and the weekly Torah portions. He has also authored the works "Shevas Achim" and "Vzos Hamitzvah".

External links 
 Nikolsburg website

Hasidic rebbes
Living people
Year of birth missing (living people)